Khuzani Nkosikhona Innocent Mpungose (born December 3, 1989) professionally known as Khuzani is a South African maskandi singer. Born and raised in Nkandla, KwaZulu-Natal, he rose to prominence after  participating on  Mgqumeni's album iSecret 2009.

Career 
Khuzani Nkosikhona Innocent Mpungose was born December 3, 1989 in Nkandla, KwaZulu-Natal. He matriculated at Sibhakabhaka High School in 2009.

That same year, Mpungose was appointed by Shobeni Khuzwayo to complete the late Mgqumeni's album iSecret.

His debut studio album Bahluleke Bonke was released in 2011. The album won Best Selling Album at the Amatshontsho ka Maskandi Awards.

On April 7, 2017, his seventh studio album Isixaxa Samaxoki was released. The album was certified gold by the Recording Industry of South Africa (RiSA) two weeks  after its release.

In the first quarter of  2019, he participated in the Gcwalisa iMabhida Maskandi Concert.

His single "Ijele" featuring Luve Dubazane was released on November 27, 2020. The song won Ukhozi FM Top 10 Song of the Year by 900k votes close to a million votes.

In October 2021, Mpungose performed at the Dubai Expo.

Honours 
In April 2021, Mpumgose was honoured at Nkandla Mayoral Awards for his outstanding achievement in the Maskandi genre.

Discography

Studio albums 
 Bahluleke Bonke (2011)
 Amampunge (2012)
 Sixosha Amambuka (2013)
 Inj'emnyama (2014)
 Isihlahla Samavukane (2015)
 Inyoni Yomthakathi (2016)
 Isixaxa Samaxoki (2017)
 Inhlinini Yoxolo Part 1 (2018)
 Inhlinini Yoxolo Part 2 (2018)
 Ispoki Esingafi (2020)
 Inja Nogodo (2021)
 Ithawula Nomqhele (2022)

Awards and nominations

References 

Living people
1989 births
People from Nkandla Local Municipality
Maskanda musicians